Aspley State High School is a secondary school situated in the northern suburbs of Brisbane, in the Australian state of Queensland.

History
Aspley State High School opened on 29 January 1963. It was originally to be called Zillmere State High School but was renamed on 17 January 1963 shortly before it opened.

Events
Aspley High students participate in many events throughout the school year, such as the Swimming Carnival, the Athletics Carnival (field and track events) and the Cross Country.

The student population is split up into four houses.

Publications
Aspley High releases a fortnightly newsletter to school members allowing current and recent news to be distributed. In December an annual yearbook named Toora is published. Toora is Aspley's longest running publication, first being released in the school's inaugural year.

School principals

Notable alumni
Mick Doohan (Grand Prix motorcycle road racing world champion)
Greg Norman (golfer)
Leigh Sales (ABC journalist and host of 7.30)
Brad Thorn (Rugby league and rugby union dual international)

See also
Lists of schools in Queensland
Education in Australia

References

External links
 Aspley High Opti-Video
 Outback Reef Website

Public high schools in Brisbane
1964 establishments in Australia
Educational institutions established in 1964